Noisy is the name or part of the name of six communes of France:
Noisy-le-Grand in the Seine-Saint-Denis département
Noisy-le-Roi in the Yvelines département
Noisy-le-Sec in the Seine-Saint-Denis département
Noisy-Rudignon in the Seine-et-Marne département
Noisy-sur-École in the Seine-et-Marne département
Noisy-sur-Oise in the Val-d'Oise département

For a different spelling, see Noise (disambiguation).